The North American X-15 is a hypersonic rocket-powered aircraft. It was operated by the United States Air Force and the National Aeronautics and Space Administration as part of the X-plane series of experimental aircraft. The X-15 set speed and altitude records in the 1960s, reaching the edge of outer space and returning with valuable data used in aircraft and spacecraft design. This set the official world record for the highest speed ever recorded by a crewed, powered aircraft, which remains unbroken.

During the X-15 program, 12pilots flew a combined 199flights. The 5Air Force pilots qualified for military astronaut wings immediately, while the 3civilian pilots were eventually awarded NASA astronaut wings in 2005, 35years after the last X-15 flight.

Design and development

The X-15 was based on a concept study from Walter Dornberger for the National Advisory Committee for Aeronautics (NACA) for a hypersonic research aircraft. The requests for proposal (RFPs) were published on 30December 1954 for the airframe and on 4February 1955 for the rocket engine. The X-15 was built by two manufacturers: North American Aviation was contracted for the airframe in November 1955, and Reaction Motors was contracted for building the engines in 1956.

Like many X-series aircraft, the X-15 was designed to be carried aloft and drop launched from under the wing of a B-52 mother ship. Air Force NB-52A, "The High and Mighty One" (serial 52-0003), and NB-52B, "The Challenger" (serial 52-0008, a.k.a. Balls 8) served as carrier planes for all X-15 flights. The X-15 fuselage was long and cylindrical, with rear fairings that flattened its appearance, and thick, dorsal and ventral wedge-fin stabilizers. Parts of the fuselage (the outer skin) were heat-resistant nickel alloy (Inconel-X750). The retractable landing gear comprised a nose-wheel carriage and two rear skids. The skids did not extend beyond the ventral fin, which required the pilot to jettison the lower fin just before landing. The lower fin was recovered by parachute.

Cockpit and pilot systems

The X-15 was the product of developmental research, and changes were made to various systems over the course of the program and between the different models. The X-15 was operated under several different scenarios, including attachment to a launch aircraft, drop, main engine start and acceleration, ballistic flight into thin air/space, re-entry into thicker air, unpowered glide to landing, and direct landing without a main-engine start. The main rocket engine operated only for a relatively short part of the flight but boosted the X-15 to its high speeds and altitudes. Without main engine thrust, the X-15's instruments and control surfaces remained functional, but the aircraft could not maintain altitude.

As the X-15 also had to be controlled in an environment where there was too little air for aerodynamic flight control surfaces, it had a reaction control system (RCS) that used rocket thrusters. There were two different X-15 pilot control setups: one used three joysticks, the other, one joystick.

The X-15 type with multiple control sticks for the pilot placed a traditional center stick between a left 3-axis joystick that sent commands to the Reaction Control System, and a third joystick on the right used during high-G maneuvers to augment the center stick. In addition to pilot input, the X-15 "Stability Augmentation System" (SAS) sent inputs to the aerodynamic controls to help the pilot maintain attitude control. The Reaction Control System (RCS) could be operated in two modes – manual and automatic. The automatic mode used a feature called "Reaction Augmentation System" (RAS) that helped stabilize the vehicle at high altitude. The RAS was typically used for approximately three minutes of an X-15 flight before automatic power off.

The alternative control setup used the MH-96 flight control system, which allowed one joystick in place of three and simplified pilot input. The MH-96 could automatically blend aerodynamic and rocket controls, depending on how effective each system was at controlling the aircraft.

Among the many controls were the rocket engine throttle and a control for jettisoning the ventral tail fin. Other features of the cockpit included heated windows to prevent icing and a forward headrest for periods of high deceleration.

In the event of ejection, the seat was designed to deploy fins, which were used until it reached a safer speed/altitude at which to deploy its main parachute. Pilots wore pressure suits, which could be pressurized with nitrogen gas.

Propulsion

The XLR11 used ethyl alcohol and liquid oxygen.

By November 1960, Reaction Motors delivered the XLR99 rocket engine, generating  of thrust. The remaining 175flights of the X-15 used XLR99 engines, in a single engine configuration. The XLR99 used anhydrous ammonia and liquid oxygen as propellant, and hydrogen peroxide to drive the high-speed turbopump that delivered propellants to the engine. It could burn  of propellant in 80seconds; Jules Bergman titled his book on the program Ninety Seconds to Space to describe the total powered flight time of the aircraft.

The HTP also fueled a turbopump for the main engines and auxiliary power units (APUs). Additional tanks for helium and liquid nitrogen performed other functions; the fuselage interior was purged with helium gas, and liquid nitrogen was used as coolant for various systems.

Wedge tail and hypersonic stability

The X-15 had a thick wedge tail to enable it to fly in a steady manner at hypersonic speeds. This produced a significant amount of base drag at lower speeds; the blunt end at the rear of the X-15 could produce as much drag as an entire F-104 Starfighter.
 Stability at hypersonic speeds was aided by side panels that could be extended from the tail to increase the overall surface area, and these panels doubled as air brakes.

Operational history

Before 1958, United States Air Force (USAF) and NACA officials discussed an orbital X-15 spaceplane, the X-15B that would launch into outer space from atop an SM-64 Navaho missile. This was canceled when the NACA became NASA and adopted Project Mercury instead.

By 1959, the Boeing X-20 Dyna-Soar space-glider program was to become the USAF's preferred means for launching military crewed spacecraft into orbit. This program was canceled in the early 1960s before an operational vehicle could be built. Various configurations of the Navaho were considered, and another proposal involved a Titan I stage.

Three X-15s were built, flying 199test flights, the last on 24October 1968.

The first X-15 flight was an unpowered glide flight by Scott Crossfield, on 8June 1959. Crossfield also piloted the first powered flight on 17September 1959, and his first flight with the XLR-99 rocket engine on 15November 1960. Twelve test pilots flew the X-15. Among these were Neil Armstrong, later a NASA astronaut and the first man to set foot on the Moon, and Joe Engle, later a commander of NASA Space Shuttle missions.

In a 1962 proposal, NASA considered using the B-52/X-15 as a launch platform for a Blue Scout rocket to place satellites weighing up to  into orbit.

In July and August 1963, pilot Joe Walker exceeded  in altitude, joining NASA astronauts and Soviet cosmonauts as the first human beings to cross that line on their way to outer space.

On 15November 1967, U.S. Air Force test pilot Major Michael J. Adams was killed during X-15 Flight 191 when X-15-3, entered a hypersonic spin while descending, then oscillated violently as aerodynamic forces increased after re-entry. As his aircraft's flight control system operated the control surfaces to their limits, acceleration built to  vertical and  lateral. The airframe broke apart at  altitude, scattering the X-15's wreckage across . On 8May 2004, a monument was erected at the cockpit's locale, near Johannesburg, California. In 1991, his name was added to the Astronaut Memorial.

The second plane, X-15-2, was rebuilt  after a landing accident on 9November 1962 which damaged the craft and injured its pilot, John McKay. The new plane renamed X-15A-2, had a new 28 -in. fuselage extension to carry liquid hydrogen. It took flight for the first time on 25June 1964.

Five principal aircraft were used during the X-15 program: three X-15 planes and two modified "nonstandard" NB-52 bombers:
  56-6670, 81 free flights
  56-6671, 31 free flights as X-15-2, 22 free flights as X-15A-2; 53 in total
  56-6672, 65 free flights, including the Flight 191 disaster
  52-003 nicknamed The High and Mighty One (retired in October 1969)
  52-008 nicknamed The Challenger, later Balls 8 (retired in November 2004)

Additionally, F-100, F-104 and F5D chase aircraft and C-130 and C-47 transports supported the program.

The 200th flight over Nevada was first scheduled for 21November 1968, to be flown by William "Pete" Knight. Numerous technical problems and outbreaks of bad weather delayed this proposed flight six times, and it was permanently canceled on 20December 1968. This X-15 (56-6670) was detached from the B-52 and then put into indefinite storage. The aircraft was later donated to the Smithsonian Air & Space Museum for display.

Current static displays

 X-15-1 (AF Ser. No. 56-6670) was on display in the National Air and Space Museum "Milestones of Flight" gallery, Washington, D.C., (the aircraft is no longer on display)
 X-15A-2 (AF Ser. No. 56-6671) is at the National Museum of the United States Air Force, at Wright-Patterson Air Force Base, near Dayton, Ohio. It was retired to the museum in October 1969. The aircraft is displayed in the museum's Research and Development Gallery alongside other "X-planes", including the Bell X-1B and Douglas X-3 Stiletto.

Mockups
 Dryden Flight Research Center, Edwards AFB, California, United States (painted with )
 Pima Air & Space Museum, adjacent to Davis-Monthan AFB, Tucson, Arizona (painted with )
 Evergreen Aviation & Space Museum, McMinnville, Oregon (painted with ). A full-scale wooden mockup of the X-15, it is displayed along with one of the rocket engines.

Stratofortress mother ships

 NB-52A (AF Ser. No. 52-003) is displayed at the Pima Air & Space Museum adjacent to Davis–Monthan AFB in Tucson, Arizona. It launched the X-15-1 30times, the X-15-2, 11times, and the X-15-3 31times (as well as the M2-F2 four times, the HL-10 11times and the X-24A twice).
 NB-52B (AF Ser. No. 52-008) is on permanent display outside the north gate of Edwards AFB, California. It launched the majority of X-15 flights.

Record flights

Highest flights

During 13 of the 199 total X-15 flights, eight pilots flew above , thereby qualifying as astronauts according to the US Armed Forces definition of the space border. All five Air Force pilots flew above 50miles and were awarded military astronaut wings contemporaneously with their achievements, including Adams, who received the distinction posthumously following the flight191 disaster. However the other three were NASA employees and did not receive a comparable decoration at the time. In 2004, the Federal Aviation Administration conferred its first-ever commercial astronaut wings on Mike Melvill and Brian Binnie, pilots of the commercial SpaceShipOne, another spaceplane with a flight profile comparable to the X-15's. Following this in 2005, NASA retroactively awarded its civilian astronaut wings to Dana (then living), and to McKay and Walker (posthumously). Forrest S. Petersen, the only Navy pilot in the X-15 program, never took the aircraft above the requisite altitude and thus never earned astronaut wings.

Of the thirteen flights, only flights 90 and 91, piloted by exceeded the Kármán line, the internationally recognized  altitude used by the FAI to denote the edge of space.

† fatal

Fastest recorded flights

Pilots

† Killed in the crash of X-15-3

Specifications

Other configurations include the Reaction Motors XLR11 equipped X-15, and the long version.

In popular culture

See also

Notes

References

Bibliography

External links

NASA
X-15: Hypersonic Research at the Edge of Space
Hypersonics Before the Shuttle: A Concise History of the X-15 Research Airplane

Non-NASA
X-15A at Encyclopedia Astronautica
X-15: Advanced Research Airplane, design summary by North America Aviation

 
X-015
1950s United States experimental aircraft
Rocket-powered aircraft
Mid-wing aircraft
Hypersonic aircraft
Spaceplanes
Crewed spacecraft
Suborbital spaceflight
High-test peroxide
1963 in spaceflight
Aircraft first flown in 1959
Reusable spacecraft
Cruciform tail aircraft